The following outline is provided as an overview of and topical guide to Guinea:

Guinea – country located in West Africa, that was formerly known as French Guinea.  Guinea's territory has a curved shape, with its base at the Atlantic Ocean, inland to the east, and turning south. The base borders Guinea-Bissau and Senegal to the north, and Mali to the north and north-east; the inland part borders Côte d'Ivoire to the south-east, Liberia to the south, and Sierra Leone to the west of the southern tip. Its water sources include the Niger, Senegal, and Gambia rivers.  Guinea is sometimes called Guinea-Conakry (Conakry being its capital) to differentiate it from the neighboring Guinea-Bissau (whose capital is Bissau).

General reference

 Pronunciation: 
 Common English country names: Guinea or Guinea-Conakry
 Official English country name: The Republic of Guinea
 Common endonym(s):  
 Official endonym(s):  
 Adjectival(s): Guinean
 Demonym(s):
 ISO country codes: GN, GIN, 324
 ISO region codes: See ISO 3166-2:GN
 Internet country code top-level domain: .gn

Geography of Guinea 

Geography of Guinea
 Guinea is: a country
 Population of Guinea: 9,370,000  - 87th most populous country
 Area of Guinea: 245,857 km2
 Atlas of Guinea

Location 
 Guinea  is situated within the following regions:
 Northern Hemisphere and Western Hemisphere
 Africa
 West Africa
 Time zone:  Coordinated Universal Time UTC+00
 Extreme points of Guinea
 High: Mont Nimba 
 Low: North Atlantic Ocean 0 m
 Land boundaries:  3,399 km
 858 km
 652 km
 610 km
 563 km
 386 km
 330 km
 Coastline:  North Atlantic Ocean 320 km

Environment of Guinea 

 Climate of Guinea
 Geology of Guinea
 Protected areas of Guinea
 Wildlife of Guinea
 Fauna of Guinea
 Birds of Guinea
 Insects of Guinea
 Butterflies of Guinea
 Moths of Guinea
 Mammals of Guinea

Natural geographic features of Guinea 

 Glaciers in Guinea: none 
 Forests in Guinea
 Upper Guinean forests
 Western Guinean lowland forests
 Guinean montane forests
 Guinean forest-savanna mosaic
 Guinean mangroves
 Rivers of Guinea
 World Heritage Sites in Guinea

Regions of Guinea 

 Natural regions of Guinea

Ecoregions of Guinea 
Ecoregions in Guinea – the following ecoregions lie partially within Guinea:
 Upper Guinean forests
 Western Guinean lowland forests
 Guinean montane forests
 Guinean forest-savanna mosaic
 West Sudanian savanna
 Guinean mangroves

Administrative divisions of Guinea 

Administrative divisions of Guinea
 Regions of Guinea
 Prefectures of Guinea
 Sub-prefectures of Guinea

Regions of Guinea 

Regions of Guinea

Prefectures of Guinea 

Prefectures of Guinea

Municipalities of Guinea 

 Capital of Guinea: Conakry
 Cities of Guinea

Demography of Guinea 

Demographics of Guinea

Government and politics of Guinea 

Politics of Guinea
 Form of government: presidential republic
 Capital of Guinea: Conakry
 Elections in Guinea
 Guinean general election, 1968
 Guinean general election, 1974
 Guinean legislative election, 1963
 Guinean legislative election, 1980
 Guinean legislative election, 1995
 Guinean legislative election, 2002
 Guinean legislative election, 2013
 Political parties in Guinea

Branches of the government of Guinea 

Government of Guinea

Executive branch of the government of Guinea 
 Head of state: President of Guinea
 Head of government: President of Guinea
 Cabinet of Guinea
 Cabinet of the First Republic of Guinea – governing body of Guinea from independence on 28 September 1958 until the death of President Ahmed Sékou Touré on 26 March 1984, followed by a bloodless coup by Colonel Lansana Conté on 5 April 1984.
 Ministers of Justice of Guinea

Legislative branch of the government of Guinea 

 National Assembly (unicameral)

Judicial branch of the government of Guinea 

 Ministers of Justice of Guinea

Foreign relations of Guinea 

Foreign relations of Guinea
 Diplomatic missions in Guinea
 Diplomatic missions of Guinea
 Embassy of Guinea in Washington, D.C.
 Embassy of Guinea, London

International organization membership 
The Republic of Guinea is a member of:

African, Caribbean, and Pacific Group of States (ACP)
African Development Bank Group (AfDB)
African Union (AU)
Economic Community of West African States (ECOWAS)
Food and Agriculture Organization (FAO)
Group of 77 (G77)
International Bank for Reconstruction and Development (IBRD)
International Civil Aviation Organization (ICAO)
International Criminal Court (ICCt)
International Criminal Police Organization (Interpol)
International Development Association (IDA)
International Federation of Red Cross and Red Crescent Societies (IFRCS)
International Finance Corporation (IFC)
International Fund for Agricultural Development (IFAD)
International Labour Organization (ILO)
International Maritime Organization (IMO)
International Monetary Fund (IMF)
International Olympic Committee (IOC)
International Organization for Migration (IOM)
International Organization for Standardization (ISO) (correspondent)
International Red Cross and Red Crescent Movement (ICRM)
International Telecommunication Union (ITU)
International Telecommunications Satellite Organization (ITSO)
International Trade Union Confederation (ITUC)

Inter-Parliamentary Union (IPU)
Islamic Development Bank (IDB)
Multilateral Investment Guarantee Agency (MIGA)
Nonaligned Movement (NAM)
Organisation internationale de la Francophonie (OIF)
Organisation of Islamic Cooperation (OIC)
Organisation for the Prohibition of Chemical Weapons (OPCW)
United Nations (UN)
United Nations Conference on Trade and Development (UNCTAD)
United Nations Educational, Scientific, and Cultural Organization (UNESCO)
United Nations High Commissioner for Refugees (UNHCR)
United Nations Industrial Development Organization (UNIDO)
United Nations Mission for the Referendum in Western Sahara (MINURSO)
United Nations Mission in the Sudan (UNMIS)
United Nations Operation in Cote d'Ivoire (UNOCI)
Universal Postal Union (UPU)
World Confederation of Labour (WCL)
World Customs Organization (WCO)
World Federation of Trade Unions (WFTU)
World Health Organization (WHO)
World Intellectual Property Organization (WIPO)
World Meteorological Organization (WMO)
World Tourism Organization (UNWTO)
World Trade Organization (WTO)

Law and order in Guinea 

Law of Guinea

 National Police and National Gendermeries
 Constitution of Guinea
 Guinean constitutional referendum, 1958
 Guinean constitutional referendum, 1990
 Guinean constitutional referendum, 2001
 Crime in Guinea
 Human trafficking in Guinea
 Polygamy in Guinea
 Human rights in Guinea
 LGBT rights in Guinea

Military of Guinea 

Military of Guinea
 Command
 Commander-in-chief:
 Forces
 Army of Guinea
 Air Force of Guinea

Local government in Guinea 

Local government in Guinea

History of Guinea

History of Guinea, by period 
History of Guinea
 Early history – see history of West Africa
 Sahelian kingdoms – the area which is now Guinea lay on the fringes of these Kingdoms
 Imamate of Futa Jallon – West African theocratic state based in the Futa Jallon highlands of modern Guinea. The state was founded around 1727 by a Fulani jihad and became part of the French colonial empire in 1896.
 Wassoulou Empire – short-lived (1878–1898) empire of West Africa built from the conquests of Dyula ruler Samori Touré and destroyed by the French colonial army.
 Anglo-French Convention of 1882 – confirmed the territorial boundaries between Guinea and Sierra Leone around Conakry and Freetown.
 Rivières du Sud – administrative division of colonial French West Africa
 French Guinea – colony until 1958, part of French West Africa
 Colonial governors of French Guinea
 Independence – in 1958, the colony chose independence from France, and named itself Guinea
 Ahmed Sékou Touré – ruled as president from 1958 to 1984
 Cabinet of the First Republic of Guinea – governing body of Guinea from independence on 28 September 1958 until the death of President Ahmed Sékou Touré on 26 March 1984, followed by a bloodless coup by Colonel Lansana Conté on 5 April 1984.
 Lansana Conté –  took over in a bloodless coup, and ruled as president from 1984 to 2008
 2007 Guinean general strike
 2008 Guinean coup d'état – Moussa Dadis Camara seized control from 23 December 2008 to 3 December 2009
 National Assembly of Guinea dissolved
 2008 Guinean military unrest
 2009 Guinea mine collapse
 Alpha Condé – elected president in 2010, survived an attempted coup less than a year later
 Guinean legislative election, 2013 – National Assembly of Guinea re-established
 2014 in Guinea
 Ebola virus epidemic in West Africa

History of Guinea, by region 
 Timeline of Conakry

History of Guinea, by subject 
 Massacres in Guinea

Culture of Guinea 

Culture of Guinea
 Architecture of Guinea
 List of buildings and structures in Guinea
 Cuisine of Guinea
 Languages of Guinea
 Music of Guinea
 Camayenne Sofa
 National symbols of Guinea
 Coat of arms of Guinea
 Flag of Guinea
 National anthem of Guinea
 People of Guinea
 List of Guineans
 Public holidays in Guinea
 Religion in Guinea
 Christianity in Guinea
 Roman Catholicism in Guinea
 List of Roman Catholic dioceses in Guinea
 Episcopal Conference of Guinea
 Hinduism in Guinea
 Islam in Guinea
 Scouting and Guiding in Guinea
 World Heritage Sites in Guinea

Art in Guinea 
 Cinema of Guinea
 List of Guinean films
 Literature of Guinea
 List of Guinean writers
 Music of Guinea

Sports in Guinea 

Sports in Guinea
 Football in Guinea
 Football clubs in Guinea
 Guinea at the Olympics
 List of Guinean records in athletics
 Guinea national basketball team

Economy and infrastructure of Guinea 

Economy of Guinea
 Economic rank, by nominal GDP (2007): 138th (one hundred and thirty eighth)
 Agriculture in Guinea
 Banking in Guinea
 Banks in Guinea
 Central Bank of the Republic of Guinea – located in Conakry
 Communications in Guinea
 Postage stamps and postal history of Guinea
 Telecommunications in Guinea
 Internet in Guinea
 Telephone numbers in Guinea
 Companies of Guinea
 Supermarket chains in Guinea
Currency of Guinea: Franc
ISO 4217: GNF
 Energy in Guinea
 Power stations in Guinea
 Health care in Guinea
 Mining in Guinea
 Trade unions in Guinea
 Transport in Guinea
 Airports in Guinea
 Rail transport in Guinea
 Railway stations in Guinea

Education in Guinea 

Education in Guinea
 National Library of Guinea
 Schools in Guinea
 Universities in Guinea

Health in Guinea 

Health in Guinea
 HIV/AIDS in Guinea

See also 

Guinea
Index of Guinea-related articles
List of Guinea-related topics
List of international rankings
Member state of the United Nations
Outline of Africa
Outline of geography

References

External links

 Official Government Website (French)

Guinea